Navin Doshi (born 1936) is an author, scholar, philanthropist, and co-founder of Nalanda International, a non-profit organization.

Early life and education 
Originally from Bombay, India, Doshi completed his undergraduate studies at the College of Engineering, Pune, and received his Bachelors of Engineering degree from the L.D. Engineering College of Gujarat University, before moving to the U.S. in 1958. In the U.S., Doshi attended University of Michigan, Ann Arbor, to complete his Master's in electrical engineering and then UCLA for his PhD program.

Career 
After his studies, Doshi started working as an aerospace engineer at TRW Inc. He started a bedspread business and made investments in real-estate and other financial instruments.
 
In 1999, Doshi with his wife, Pratima Doshi endowed the Doshi Chair of Indian History at UCLA and founded the Sardar Patel Award. In 2006, Doshi endowed a professorship for Indic traditions at Loyola Marymount University (LMU) which also gives a Bridgebuilder Award annually, jointly with Bellarmine College of Liberal Arts and the Department of Theological Studies. He is also a member of the LMU Advisory Board since 2009, the board of directors of South Asian Studies Association and on the board of directors of the Indic Foundation.
In 2020, Doshi created an endowment to support academic works of SASA and this endowment is attached to the Doshi Professor of Indic and Comparative Theology at LMU.

In 2012, Doshi established the Haridas Chaudhuri Chair in Indian Philosophies and Cultures and a Doshi professorship in Asian Art at California Institute of Integral Studies (CIIS). In 2019, he established a chair on water and sanitation research, named after his parents, Kanchan and Harilal Doshi, at the Indian Institute of Technology Gandhinagar.
 
In 2019, Doshi received the Doctorate of Peace award from the Maharishi University of Management in Iowa.

Books 

Saving Us from Ourselves, 2005 – 
Transcendence: Saving Us From Ourselves, 2009 – 
Economics and Nature: Essays in Balance, Complementarity and Harmony, 2012 – 
Light With No Shadow: My Life Bridging Two Cultures, 2016 – 
Gold Incarnate Sun Gold, 2019 –

Bibliography
South Asian Studies: Bridging Cultures, A Felicitation Volume to Celebrate the Life and Work of Navin Doshi, edited by Deepak Shimkhada, 2020 –

References 

American writers of Indian descent
1936 births
Living people